Antônio Amaral Filho (April 4, 1921 – January 24, 1988) was an Olympic backstroke swimmer from Brazil, who participated at one Summer Olympics for his native country.

At the 1936 Summer Olympics in Berlin, he swam the 100m backstroke and did not reach the finals.

References

1988 deaths
Brazilian male backstroke swimmers
Swimmers at the 1936 Summer Olympics
Olympic swimmers of Brazil
1921 births
Place of birth missing
20th-century Brazilian people